Ankhon Dekhi  is a 2014 Indian Hindi-language drama film written and directed by Rajat Kapoor and produced by Manish Mundra. It stars Sanjay Mishra and Rajat Kapoor. The film was released on 21 March 2014. It was the opening film at the 8th annual Mosaic International South Asian Film Festival (MISAFF) 2014 in Toronto. It is Kapoor's fifth feature film and was dedicated to his idols and teachers: filmmakers Mani Kaul and Kumar Shahani. At the 2015 Screen Awards ceremony, Ankhon Dekhi won the awards for Best Supporting Actress for Seema Pahwa, Best Story and Best Ensemble Cast.The movie instills a sense of empiricism through personal choice and experience where Bauji rejects to believe anything he is told unless he has seen it himself and whenever people say something is one way or another, he nods that it might be, without acknowledging it. The movie encompasses the Derridean philosophy of deconstruction of reality.

Plot 
Rajesh Bauji (Sanjay Mishra) is a man in his late 50s, living a dreary but eventful life in a small house in old Delhi with his extended family. The movie starts with Babuji narrating his dream where he sees himself flying like a bird free from all the worldly affairs. A random incident is going to change his life in a dramatic way, though he does not realise it at the moment. Bauji's daughter has been seeing a boy of ill repute. When that fact is revealed to the family, after much deliberation they decide to lock up the girl and go beat the wilful boy.

When they confront the boy, to Babuji he seems like a very nice person. This event radically changes his life — he decides that he will believe only what he can see, hence the title Ankhon Dekhi. After a while he refuses to worship god and treats prasad (offerings) as just another sweet. He is working as a travel agent and refuses to book tickets to Amsterdam as he has never seen Amsterdam. To uphold his ideals, he quits his job. He resorts to a very idealistic mode and takes things to extreme levels to explore his theory. At first his neighbours consider him a lunatic old man, but over time they start admiring his logical reasoning and start following him.

Once while intervening in a petty loan issue with a loan shark, he refuses to believe the bad reputation of the shark. He concludes that he is a good person, based on his observation. He forms a rapport with the loan shark and is recruited by him in his illegal gambling den. His followers join.

He gives consent to his daughter's marriage to the boy she loves and almost sorts out the emotional issues with his estranged brother.

Now free from all responsibility, he leads a life where there are almost no blind spots and a lot of clarity. He takes his wife for a vacation.

While chatting he narrates to his wife that he feels very light, like a bird flying in free skies. His wife jokes about his experience, inadvertently challenging his own theory that he doesn't know how a bird actually flies. In the middle of the night he walks towards a cliff. Babuji narrates his dream (as in the beginning of the story). He has yet to experience flying. As the film ends, Bauji is seen flying down a cliff.

Cast
  Sanjay Mishra as Rajesh Bauji
  Rajat Kapoor as Rishi Chacha
  Seema Pahwa as Amma
  Namit Das as Ajju
  Shripad Raorane as Sharma ji
  Brijendra Kala as Shibbo Babu
  Manu Rishi as Sharma ji
  Maya Sarao as Rita
  Taranjit Kaur as Chachi
  Chandrachoor Rai as Shammi
  Alka Chawla as Sarup Bua
  Mahesh Sharma as Bauaa
  Anil Chaudhary as Chaudhary Saab
  Shrikant Varma as Master Ji
  Manish Karnatak as Jeevan
  Dhruv Singh as Dhruv
  Saurabh Shukla as Boss
  Danish Hussain as Gopi
  Yogendra Tiku as Panditji
  Chaitanya Mahawar as Ashok
 Chetan Sharma as Anil
  Shivam Sethi as Arun
  Ranvir Shorey Cameo Appearance in one scene 
  Yadvinder Singh Brar as Goon
  Rajiv Narang as Gambler

Critical response
Aankhon Dekhi opened to critical appreciation. Most critics praised all the performances and the deeply rich philosophical undertones of the script.

Rajeev Masand of CNN-IBN gave the film 3.5/5 stars stating, "Through the wonderfully whimsical Ankhon Dekhi, writer-director Rajat Kapoor shows us how the journey could be more meaningful if we lived life the way we choose to."

Anupama Chopra of Hindustan Times gave 3.5/5 and mentioned, "the strands come together with such a heave of emotion that I found myself wiping away tears. Ankhon Dekhi is a lovely respite from the formulaic fare that clutters our multiplexes week after week."

Independent film scholar Baradwaj Rangan praised the acting and casting stating "Watching Rajat Kapoor's marvellous Ankhon Dekhi, you may find yourself wishing that we had one of those "Outstanding Performance by a Cast in a Motion Picture" awards. The casting is perfect, the performances exquisite. It's a cliché to say that an actor has "lived" his role – but that sense of not-acting-but-being is all-pervasive here."

Sukanya Varma of Rediff went with 4/5 stars, saying "For all its existentialism crisis, Aankhon Dekhi'''s heart lies in Kapoor's affectionate depiction of humdrum living, the tender father-daughter relationship between Bauji and Rita (Maya Sarao), the unspoken attachment between him and his younger brother and the concerned anxiety of his rock solid wife."

Shubra Gupta of Indian Express, usually a very harsh critic, gave the film a surprising 4/5, mentioning about the central character, "He is fool, clown and man, all in one. He is us. I have seen it with my own eyes, and I can tell you that Aankhon Dekhi is a fine, fine film."

One of the few differing voices was Madhureetha Mukherjee of India Today who gave 2.5/5 stars stating "What doesn't work for the film is the fact that it borders on abstract at regular intervals and lacks continuity, making a few scenes and conversations seem out-of-context." However, she still recommended that people watch it.

Awards
Filmfare Awards

Won – Filmfare Award for Best Film (Critics) 2014
Won – Filmfare Award for Best Actor (Critics) 2014 – Sanjay Mishra
Won – Filmfare Award for Best Story 2014 – Rajat Kapoor

Screen Awards

 Won – Star Screen Award for Best Story – Rajat Kapoor
 Won – Star Screen Award for Best Supporting Actress – Seema Pahwa [Shared with Tabu who won it for Haider]

Mirchi Music Awards

 Nominated - Raag-Inspired Song of the Year 2014 - "Aayi Bahaar"

MusicAnkhon Dekhi'' features an unusual soundtrack combining Indian classical melodies with modern rhythms. The score was composed by Saagar Desai, and the lyrics were written by Varun Grover. The soundtrack was well received with many calling it a 'breath of fresh air' due to the melodies being composed with classical instruments.

References

External links
 

2010s Hindi-language films
2013 films
Films set in Delhi
Indian avant-garde and experimental films
2010s avant-garde and experimental films